The following article documents the album, single and multimedia releases by the British recording group Wang Chung.

Albums

Studio albums

Soundtrack albums

Compilation albums

Extended plays

Singles

Other appearances

References

Discography
Wang Chung
Pop music group discographies
New wave discographies